Rahshon Turner (born March 10, 1975) is an American former professional basketball player. Turner is a veteran of the European leagues, playing for teams in the Netherlands, France, Israel, and Spain. In 2008-09 he was the top rebounder in the Israel Basketball Premier League.

College career 

Turner spent his collegiate career at Fairleigh Dickinson University Knights from 1994 to 1998. He began by being named Newcomer of the Year in the Northeast Conference (NEC). He made the NEC First Team in 1997 and 1998. In his last college season, he averaged 17.9 points, 10.6 rebounds, 2.1 blocks, 1.6 assists and 1.1 steals per game as FDU won its third league title. He led the Knights to a berth in the 1998 NCAA Tournament and nearly upset the University of Connecticut Huskies in the First round of March Madness.

Professional career 

Turner tried to continue his career as a professional in Europe, but failed to stay on with teams in the Netherlands and France that first year out of school. He then returned to New Jersey and became a women's basketball assistant coach at the New Jersey Institute of Technology.

After less than two years, he decided to give pro ball another shot across the Atlantic. Turner, a power forward, played one season in Spain, and with the 2006–’07 season, was in his sixth straight season playing professional ball in France.

Turner averaged 15.4 points and 7.8 rebounds per game in 28 French League games in 2005–’06, and was named the top forward in the league by eurobasket.com. He has won several honors during his European career and was averaging 10.6 points per game and 5.0 rebounds per game as of January 11, 2007.

In 2008-09 he was the top rebounder in the Israel Basketball Premier League.

References

External links 
 Photo et fiche du mans sarthe basket
 Sa fiche sur le site de la LNB
 Turner to reinforce Gin Kings

1975 births
Living people
American expatriate basketball people in Argentina
American expatriate basketball people in France
American expatriate basketball people in Israel
American expatriate basketball people in the Netherlands
American expatriate basketball people in the Philippines
American expatriate basketball people in Poland
American expatriate basketball people in Spain
American men's basketball coaches
American men's basketball players
Siarka Tarnobrzeg (basketball) players
Barangay Ginebra San Miguel players
Basketball players from New Jersey
BCM Gravelines players
Centers (basketball)
Donar (basketball club) players
Fairleigh Dickinson Knights men's basketball players
Israeli Basketball Premier League players
Ironi Ashkelon players
JA Vichy players
Le Mans Sarthe Basket players
Libertad de Sunchales basketball players
Menorca Bàsquet players
Passaic High School alumni
Philippine Basketball Association imports
Power forwards (basketball)
Sportspeople from Passaic, New Jersey
UB La Palma players